Holothrix socotrana is a species of plant in the family Orchidaceae. It is endemic to Yemen.  Its natural habitat is subtropical or tropical dry forests.

References

Endemic flora of Socotra
socotrana
Vulnerable plants
Taxonomy articles created by Polbot